Jaiko may refer to:

Jeikó language, also spelled Jaiko
Jaiko (ジャイ子) Jaiko Gouda List of Doraemon characters
"Jaiko" (song), a 2013 single by Eiko Shimamiya

See also
 Jaicko (born 1991), Bajan contemporary pop music singer/songwriter